The , also known as the Waseda–KO rivalry, is a college rivalry between two universities located in Tokyo, Japan: Waseda University and Keio University. Waseda University also has a close relationship with Meiji University, and the sports competition between these two universities is known as Someisen. These schools are regarded as the most prestigious private universities in Japan. The rivalry dates back to the introduction of baseball in Japan during the Meiji period (1868–1912). In Keio University, it is called Keisōsen, too.

See also
 Yonsei-KU rivalry
 Harvard-Yale Rivalry

References

College sports rivalries
Sport in Japan
Waseda University
Keio University